Uffington was a rural district in Lincolnshire, Parts of Kesteven from 1894 to 1931.

It was created in 1894 from that part of the Stamford rural sanitary district which was in Kesteven (the rest forming part of either Ketton Rural District in Rutland, Easton on the Hill Rural District in Northamptonshire, or Barnack Rural District in the Soke of Peterborough).

It covered the following parishes:
Barholm
Braceborough
Greatford
Stowe
Tallington
Uffington
West Deeping
Wilsthorpe

It was abolished by a County Review Order in 1931, and went to form part of the South Kesteven Rural District.

References
http://www.visionofbritain.org.uk/relationships.jsp?u_id=10027135&c_id=10001043

Districts of England created by the Local Government Act 1894
Rural districts of Kesteven